The 1984 Western Athletic Conference men's basketball tournament was held March 7–10 at the Special Events Center in El Paso, Texas. This was the first edition of the tournament.

Top-seeded UTEP defeated  in the inaugural championship game, 44–38, to clinch their first WAC men's tournament championship.

The Miners, in turn, received an automatic bid to the 1984 NCAA tournament while second-seeded BYU, who fell in the semifinal round, received an at-large bid.

Bracket

References

WAC men's basketball tournament
Tournament
WAC men's basketball tournament
WAC men's basketball tournament
Basketball competitions in El Paso, Texas
College basketball tournaments in Texas